The Hudson's Bay Company (HBC) is a Canadian retail business group. A fur trading business for much of its existence, it became the largest and oldest corporation in Canada, and now owns and operates retail stores across the country. The company's namesake business division is Hudson's Bay, commonly referred to as The Bay ( in French).

After incorporation by English royal charter in 1677, the company functioned as the de facto government in parts of North America for nearly 200 years until the HBC sold the land it owned (the entire Hudson Bay drainage basin, known as Rupert's Land) to Canada in 1869 as part of the Deed of Surrender, authorized by the Rupert's Land Act 1868. At its peak, the company controlled the fur trade throughout much of the English- and later British-controlled North America. By the mid-19th century, the company evolved into a mercantile business selling a wide variety of products from furs to fine homeware in a small number of sales shops (as opposed to trading posts) across Canada. These shops were the first step towards the department stores the company owns today.

In 2006, an American businessman, Jerry Zucker, bought HBC for US$1.1 billion. In 2008, HBC was acquired by NRDC Equity Partners, which also owned the upmarket American department store Lord & Taylor. From 2008 to 2012, the HBC was run through a holding company of NRDC, Hudson's Bay Trading Company, which was dissolved in early 2012. HBC's Canadian headquarters are located in Toronto and its U.S. headquarters are in New York. The company spun off most of its European operations by August 2019 and its remaining stores there, in the Netherlands, were sold by the end of 2019.

Until March 2020, the company was listed on the Toronto Stock Exchange under the symbol "HBC.TO" until Richard Baker and a group of shareholders took the company private. HBC is,  the majority owner of eCommerce companies Saks and Saks Off 5th, both established as separate operating companies in 2021. HBC wholly owns SFA, the entity that operates Saks Fifth Avenue's physical locations; O5, the operating company for Saks Off 5th stores; The Bay, an eCommerce marketplace and Hudson's Bay, the operating company for Hudson's Bay's brick-and-mortar stores.

History

17th century

For much of the 17th century the French colonists in North America based in New France, operated a de facto monopoly in the North American fur trade. Two French traders, Pierre-Esprit Radisson and Médard des Groseilliers (Médard de Chouart, Sieur des Groseilliers), Radisson's brother-in-law, learned from the Cree that the best fur country lay north and west of Lake Superior, and that there was a "frozen sea" still further north. Assuming this was Hudson Bay, they sought French backing for a plan to set up a trading post on the Bay in order to reduce the cost of moving furs overland. According to Peter C. Newman, "concerned that exploration of the Hudson Bay route might shift the focus of the fur trade away from the St. Lawrence River, the French governor", Marquis d'Argenson (in office 1658–61), "refused to grant the coureurs des bois permission to scout the distant territory". Despite this refusal, in 1659 Radisson and Groseilliers set out for the upper Great Lakes basin. A year later they returned to Montreal with premium furs, evidence of the potential of the Hudson Bay region. Subsequently, they were arrested by French authorities for trading without a license and fined, and their furs were confiscated by the government.

Determined to establish trade in the Hudson Bay area, Radisson and Groseilliers approached a group of English colonial merchants in Boston, Massachusetts to help finance their explorations. The Bostonians agreed on the plan's merits, but their speculative voyage in 1663 failed when their ship ran into pack ice in Hudson Strait. Boston-based English commissioner Colonel George Cartwright learned of the expedition and brought the two to England to raise financing. Radisson and Groseilliers arrived in London in 1665 at the height of the Great Plague. Eventually, the two met and gained the sponsorship of Prince Rupert. Prince Rupert introduced the two to his cousin, the reigning king – Charles II. In 1668 the English expedition acquired two ships, the Nonsuch and the Eaglet, to explore possible trade into Hudson Bay. Groseilliers sailed on the Nonsuch, commanded by Captain Zachariah Gillam, while the Eaglet was commanded by Captain William Stannard and accompanied by Radisson. On 5 June 1668, both ships left port at Deptford, England, but the Eaglet was forced to turn back off the coast of Ireland.

The Nonsuch continued to James Bay, the southern portion of Hudson Bay, where its explorers founded, in 1668, the first fort on Hudson Bay, Charles Fort at the mouth of the Rupert River. It later became known as "Rupert House", and developed as the community of present-day Waskaganish, Quebec. Both the fort and the river were named after the sponsor of the expedition, Prince Rupert of the Rhine, one of the major investors and soon to become the new company's first governor. After a successful trading expedition over the winter of 1668–69, Nonsuch returned to England on 9 October 1669 with the first cargo of fur resulting from trade in Hudson Bay. The bulk of the fur – worth £1,233 – was sold to Thomas Glover, one of London's most prominent furriers. This and subsequent purchases by Glover proved the viability of the fur trade in Hudson Bay.

A royal charter from King Charles II incorporated "The Governor and Company of Adventurers of England, trading into Hudson's Bay" on 2 May 1670. The charter granted the company a monopoly over the region drained by all rivers and streams flowing into Hudson Bay in northern parts of present-day Canada. The area was named "Rupert's Land"
after Prince Rupert,
the first governor of the company appointed by the King. This drainage basin of Hudson Bay spans , comprising over one-third of the area of modern-day Canada, and stretches into the present-day north-central United States. The specific boundaries remained unknown at the time. Rupert's Land would eventually become Canada's largest land "purchase" in the 19th century.

The HBC established six posts between 1668 and 1717. Rupert House(1668, southeast), Moose Factory (1673, south) and Fort Albany, Ontario (1679, west) were erected on James Bay; three other posts were established on the western shore of Hudson Bay proper: New Severn (1685), York Factory (1684) and Fort Churchill (1717). Inland posts were not built until 1774. After 1774, York Factory became the main post because of its convenient access to the vast interior waterway-systems of the Saskatchewan and Red rivers. Originally called "factories" because the "factor", i.e., a person acting as a mercantile agent, did business from there, these posts operated in the manner of the Dutch fur-trading operations in New Netherland. By adoption of the Standard of Trade in the 18th century, the HBC ensured consistent pricing throughout Rupert's Land. A means of exchange arose based on the "Made Beaver" (MB); a prime pelt, worn for a year and ready for processing: "the prices of all trade goods were set in values of Made Beaver (MB) with other animal pelts, such as squirrel, otter and moose quoted in their MB (made beaver) equivalents. For example, two otter pelts might equal 1 MB".

During the fall and winter, First Nations men and European trappers accomplished the vast majority of the animal trapping and pelt preparation. They travelled by canoe and on foot to the forts to sell their pelts. In exchange they typically received popular trade-goods such as knives, kettles, beads, needles, and the Hudson's Bay point blanket. The arrival of the First Nations trappers was one of the high points of the year, met with pomp and circumstance. The highlight was very formal, an almost ritualized "Trading Ceremony" between the Chief Trader and the Captain of the aboriginal contingent who traded on their behalf. During the initial years of the fur trade, prices for items varied from post to post.

The early coastal factory model of the English contrasted with the system of the French, who established an extensive system of inland posts at native villages and sent traders to live among the tribes of the region, learning their languages and often forming alliances through marriages with indigenous women. The French appointed Pierre Le Moyne d'Iberville, who had shown great heroism during the raids, as commander of the company's captured posts. In 1687 an English attempt to resettle Fort Albany failed due to strategic deceptions by d'Iberville. After 1688 England and France were officially at war, and the conflict played out in North America as well. D'Iberville raided Fort Severn in 1690 but did not attempt to raid the well-defended local headquarters at York Factory. In 1693 the HBC recovered Fort Albany; d'Iberville captured York Factory in 1694, but the company recovered it the next year.

In 1697 d'Iberville again commanded a French naval raid on York Factory. On the way to the fort he defeated three ships of the Royal Navy in the Battle of Hudson's Bay (5 September 1697), the largest naval battle in the history of the North American Arctic. D'Iberville's depleted French force captured York Factory by laying siege to the fort and pretending to be a much larger army. The French retained all of the outposts except Fort Albany until 1713. (A small French and Indian force attacked Fort Albany again in 1709 during Queen Anne's War but was unsuccessful. The economic consequences of the French possession of these posts for the company were significant; the HBC did not pay any dividends for more than 20 years. See Anglo-French conflicts on Hudson Bay.

18th century
With the ending of the Nine Years' War in 1697, and the War of the Spanish Succession in 1713 with the signing of the Treaty of Utrecht, France had made substantial concessions. Among the treaty's many provisions, it required France to relinquish all claims to Great Britain on the Hudson Bay, which again became a British possession. (The Kingdom of Great Britain had been established following the union of Scotland and England in 1707).

After the treaty, the HBC built Prince of Wales Fort, a stone star fort at the mouth of the nearby Churchill River.In 1782, during the American Revolutionary War, a French squadron under Jean-François de Galaup, comte de Lapérouse captured and demolished York Factory and Prince of Wales Fort in support of the American rebels.

In its trade with native peoples, Hudson's Bay Company exchanged wool blankets, called Hudson's Bay point blankets, for the beaver pelts trapped by aboriginal hunters. By 1700, point blankets accounted for more than 60 per cent of the trade. The number of indigo stripes (a.k.a. points) woven into the blankets identified its finished size. A long-held misconception is that the number of stripes was related to its value in beaver pelts.

A parallel may be drawn between the HBC's control over Rupert's Land with the trade monopoly and government functions enjoyed by the East India Company over India during roughly the same period. The HBC invested £10,000 in the East India Company in 1732, which it viewed as a major competitor.

Hudson's Bay Company's first inland trading post was established by Samuel Hearne in 1774 with Cumberland House, Saskatchewan.

Conversely, a number of inland HBC "houses" pre-date the construction of Cumberland House, in 1774. Henley House, established in 1743, inland from Hudson Bay, at the confluence of the Albany and Kabinakagami Rivers, was dependent on Albany River – Fort Albany for lines of communication, was not "finished" until 1768. Next, the inland houses of Split Lake and Nelson Houses were established between 1740 and 1760. These were dependent on York River – York Factory and Churchill River, respectively. Although not inland, Richmond Fort was established in 1749. This was on an island within Hudson Bay. It was titled a "New Discovery" in 1749, and by 1750 was titled Richmond Gulf. The name was changed to Richmond Fort and given the abbreviation RF from 1756 to 1759, it served mainly as a trade goods and provisions storage location. Additional inland posts were Capusco River and Chickney Creek, both circa 1750. Likewise, Brunswick (1776), New Brunswick (1777), Gloucester (1777), Upper Hudson (ca. 1778), Lower Hudson (1779), Rupert, and Wapiscogami Houses were established in the decade of the 1770s. These post-date Cumberland House, yet speak to the expanding inland incursion of the HBC in the last quarter of the 18th century. Minor posts also during this time period include Mesackamy/Mesagami Lake (1777), Sturgeon Lake (1778), Beaver Lake Posts.

In 1779, other traders founded the North West Company (NWC) in Montreal as a seasonal partnership to provide more capital and to continue competing with the HBC. It became operative for the outfit of 1780 and was the first joint-stock company in Canada and possibly North America. The agreement lasted one year. A second agreement established in 1780 had a three-year term. The company became a permanent entity in 1783. By 1784, the NWC had begun to make serious inroads into the HBC's profits.

19th century

The North West Company (NWC) was the main rival in the fur trade. The competition led to the small Pemmican War in 1816. The Battle of Seven Oaks on 19 June 1816 was the climax of the long dispute. In 1821, the North West Company of Montreal and Hudson's Bay Company were forcibly merged by intervention of the British government to put an end to often-violent competition. 175 posts, 68 of them the HBC's, were reduced to 52 for efficiency and because many were redundant as a result of the rivalry and were inherently unprofitable. Their combined territory was extended by a licence to the North-Western Territory, which reached to the Arctic Ocean in the north and, with the creation of the Columbia Department in the Pacific Northwest, to the Pacific Ocean in the west. The NWC's regional headquarters at Fort George (Fort Astoria) was relocated to Fort Vancouver on the north bank of the Columbia River; it became the HBC base of operations on the Pacific Slope.

Before the merger, the employees of the HBC, unlike those of the North West Company, did not participate in its profits. After the merger, with all operations under the management of Sir George Simpson (1826–60), the company had a corps of commissioned officers: 25 chief factors and 28 chief traders, who shared in the company's profits during the monopoly years. Its trade covered , and it had 1,500 contract employees.

Between 1820 and 1870, the HBC issued its own paper money. The notes, denominated in sterling, were printed in London and issued at York Factory for circulation primarily in the Red River Colony.

Competition and exploration
Although the HBC maintained a monopoly on the fur trade during the early to mid-19th century, there was competition from James Sinclair and Andrew McDermot (Dermott), independent traders in the Red River Colony. They shipped furs by the Red River Trails to Norman Kittson, a buyer in the United States. In addition, Americans controlled the maritime fur trade on the Northwest Coast until the 1830s.

Throughout the 1820s and the 1830s, the HBC controlled nearly all trading operations in the Pacific Northwest region and was based at its headquarters at Fort Vancouver, on the Columbia River. Although claims to the region were by agreement in abeyance, commercial operating rights were nominally shared by the United States and Britain through the Anglo-American Convention of 1818, but company policy, enforced via Chief Factor John McLoughlin of the company's Columbia District, was to discourage U.S. settlement of the territory. The company's effective monopoly on trade virtually forbade any settlement in the region. It established Fort Boise in 1834 (in present-day southwestern Idaho) to compete with the American Fort Hall,  to the east. In 1837, it purchased Fort Hall, also along the route of the Oregon Trail. The outpost director displayed the abandoned wagons of discouraged settlers to those seeking to move west along the trail.

HBC trappers were deeply involved in the early exploration and development of Northern California. Company trapping brigades were sent south from Fort Vancouver, along what became known as the Siskiyou Trail, into Northern California as far south as the San Francisco Bay Area, where the company operated a trading post at Yerba Buena (San Francisco). These trapping brigades in Northern California faced serious risks, and were often the first to explore relatively uncharted territory. They included the lesser known Peter Skene Ogden and Samuel Black.

It also operated a store in what were then known as the Sandwich Islands (now Hawai'i), engaging in merchant shipping to the islands between 1828 and 1859.

The company's stranglehold on the region was broken by the first successful large wagon train to reach Oregon in 1843, led by Marcus Whitman. In the years that followed, thousands of emigrants poured into the Willamette Valley of Oregon. In 1846, the United States acquired full authority south of the 49th parallel; the most settled areas of the Oregon Country were south of the Columbia River in what is now Oregon. McLoughlin, who had once turned away would-be settlers when he was company director, then welcomed them from his general store at Oregon City. He later became known as the "Father of Oregon." The company retains no presence today in the portion of the Pacific Northwest governed by the United States.

End of monopoly

The Guillaume Sayer trial in 1849 contributed to the end of the HBC monopoly. Guillaume Sayer, a Métis trapper and trader, was accused of illegal trading in furs. The Court of Assiniboia brought Sayer to trial, before a jury of HBC officials and supporters. During the trial, a crowd of armed Métis men led by Louis Riel Sr. gathered outside the courtroom. Although Sayer was found guilty of illegal trade, having evaded the HBC monopoly, Judge Adam Thom did not levy a fine or punishment. Some accounts attributed that to the intimidating armed crowd gathered outside the courthouse. With the cry, "" ("Trade is free! Trade is free!"), the Métis loosened the HBC's previous control of the courts, which had enforced their monopoly on the settlers of Red River.

Another factor was the findings of the Palliser Expedition of 1857 to 1860, led by Captain John Palliser. He surveyed the area of the prairies and wilderness from Lake Superior to the southern passes of the Rocky Mountains. Although he recommended against settlement of the region, the report sparked a debate. It ended the myth publicized by Hudson's Bay Company: that the Canadian West was unfit for agricultural settlement.

In 1863, the International Financial Society bought controlling interest in the HBC, signalling a shift in the company's outlook: most of the new shareholders were less interested in the fur trade than in real estate speculation and economic development in the West. The Society floated £2 million in public shares on non-ceded land held ostensibly by the Hudson's Bay Company as an asset and leveraged this asset for collateral for these funds. These funds allowed the Society the financial means to weather the financial collapse of 1866 which destroyed many competitors and invest in railways in North America.

In 1869, after rejecting the American government offer of million, the company approved the return of Rupert's Land to Britain. The government gave it to Canada and loaned the new country the £300,000 required to compensate HBC for its losses. HBC also received one-twentieth of the fertile areas to be opened for settlement and retained title to the lands on which it had built trading establishments. The deal, known as the Deed of Surrender, came into force the following year. The resulting territory, the North-West Territories, was brought under Canadian jurisdiction under the terms of the Rupert's Land Act 1868, enacted by the Parliament of the United Kingdom. The Deed enabled the admission of the fifth province, Manitoba, to the Confederation on 15 July 1870, the same day that the deed itself came into force.

During the 19th century the Hudson's Bay Company went through great changes in response to such factors as growth of population and new settlements in part of its territory, and ongoing pressure from Britain. It seemed unlikely that it would continue to control the future of the West.

Shift to department stores

The iconic department store today evolved from trading posts at the start of the 19th century, when they began to see demand for general merchandise grow rapidly. HBC soon expanded into the interior and set-up posts along river settlements that later developed into the modern cities of Winnipeg, Calgary and Edmonton. In 1857, the first sales shop was established in Fort Langley. This was followed by other sales shops in Fort Victoria (1859), Winnipeg (1881), Calgary (1884), Vancouver (1887), Vernon (1887), Edmonton (1890), Yorkton (1898), and Nelson (1902). The first of the grand "original six" department stores was built in Calgary in 1913. The other department stores that followed were in Edmonton, Vancouver, Victoria, Saskatoon, and Winnipeg.

20th century
The First World War interrupted a major remodelling and restoration of retail trade shops planned in 1912. Following the war, the company revitalized its fur-trade and real-estate activities, and diversified its operations by venturing into the oil business. The company co-founded Hudson's Bay Oil and Gas Company (HBOG) in 1926 with Marland Oil Company (which merged with Conoco in 1929). Although the company diversified into a number of areas, its department store business is the only remaining part of the company's operations, in the form of department stores under the Hudson's Bay brand.  The company also established new trading posts in the Canadian Arctic.

Indigenous health 
The medical scientist Frederick Banting was travelling in the Arctic in 1927 when he realized that crew or passengers on board the HBC paddle wheeler SS Distributor were responsible for spreading the influenza virus down the Slave River and Mackenzie River. Less than a decade after the 1918 global flu pandemic, a similar virus spread territory-wide over the summer and autumn, devastating the aboriginal population of the north. Returning from the trip, Banting gave an interview in Montreal with a Toronto Star reporter under the agreement that his statements on HBC would remain off the record. The newspaper nonetheless published the conversation, which rapidly reached a wide audience across Europe and Australia. Banting was angry at the leak, having promised the Department of the Interior not to make any statements to the press prior to clearing them.

The article noted that Banting had given the journalist C. R. Greenaway repeated instances of how the fox fur trade always favoured the company: "For over $100,000 of fox skins, he estimated that the Eskimos had not received $5,000 worth of goods." He traced this treatment to health, consistent with reports made in previous years by RCMP officers, suggesting that "the result was a diet of 'flour, sea-biscuits, tea and tobacco,' with the skins that once were used for clothing traded merely for 'cheap whiteman's goods.

The HBC fur trade commissioner called Banting's remarks "false and slanderous", and a month later, the governor and general manager met Banting at the King Edward Hotel to demand a retraction. Banting stated that the reporter had betrayed his confidence, but did not retract his statement and reaffirmed that HBC was responsible for the death of indigenous residents by supplying the wrong kind of food and introducing diseases into the Arctic. As A. Y. Jackson, the Group of Seven painter with whom Banting was travelling, noted in his memoir that since neither the governor nor the general manager had been to the Arctic, the meeting ended with them asking Banting's advice on what HBC ought to do: "He gave them some good advice and later he received a card at Christmas with the Governor's best wishes."

Banting maintained this position in his report to the Department of the Interior:He noted that "infant mortality was high because of the undernourishment of the mother before birth"; that "white man’s food leads to decay of native teeth"; that "tuberculosis has commenced. Saw several cases at Godhavn, Etah, Port Burwell, Arctic Bay"; that "an epidemic resembling influenza killed a considerable proportion of population at Port Burwell"; and that "the gravest danger faces the Eskimo in his transfer from a race-long hunter to a dependent trapper. White flour, sea-biscuits, tea and tobacco do not provide sufficient fuel to warm and nourish him". Furthermore, he discouraged the establishment of an Arctic hospital. The "proposed hospital at Pangnirtung would be a waste of money, as it could be reached by only a few natives". Banting's report contrasted starkly with the bland descriptions provided by the ship's physician, F. H. Stringer.

Latter 20th century

In 1960, the company acquired Morgan's allowing it to expand into Montreal, Toronto, Hamilton, and Ottawa. In 1965, HBC rebranded its department stores as The Bay. The Morgan's logo was changed to match the new visual identity. By 1972 the last of the former Morgan's stores had been rebranded to Bay stores. HBOG also expanded during the 1960s, as it began shipping Canadian crude through a new link to the Glacier pipeline and on to the refinery in Billings, Montana. The company became the sixth-largest Canadian oil producer in 1967.

In 1970, on the company's 300th anniversary, as a result of punishing new British tax laws, the company relocated to Canada, and was rechartered as a Canadian business corporation under Canadian law, Head Office functions were transferred from London to Winnipeg. By 1974, as the company expanded into eastern Canada, head office functions were moved to Toronto.

In 1972, the company acquired the four-store Shop-Rite chain of catalogue stores. The chain was quickly expanded to 65 stores in Ontario, but closed in 1982 due to declining sales. In these stores, little merchandise was displayed; customers made their selections from catalogues, and staff would retrieve the merchandise from storerooms. The HBC also acquired Freimans department stores in Ottawa and converted them to The Bay.

In 1973, HBOG acquired a 35 per cent stake in Siebens Oil and Gas, and, in 1979, it divested that interest. In 1980, it bought a controlling interest in Roxy Petroleum.

In 1978, the Zellers discount store chain made a bid to acquire the HBC, but the HBC turned the tables and acquired Zellers. Also in 1978, Simpson's department stores were acquired by Hudson's Bay Company, and were converted to Bay stores in 1991. (The related chain Simpsons-Sears was not acquired by the Bay, but became Sears Canada in 1978.) In 1991, Simpsons disappeared, when the last Simpsons store was converted to the Bay banner.

In 1979, Canadian billionaire Kenneth Thomson won control of the company in a battle with George Weston Limited, and acquired a 75 per cent stake for $400 million. Thomson sold the company's oil and gas business, financial services, distillery, and other interests for approximately $550 million, transforming the company into a leaner, more focused operation.  In the 1980s, sales and oil prices slipped, while debt from acquisitions piled up which led to Hudson's Bay Company selling its 10.1 per cent stake in HBOG to Dome Petroleum in 1981. In 1997, the Thomson family sold the last of its remaining shares.

Hudson's Bay Company reversed a formidable debt problem in 1987, by shedding non-strategic assets such as its wholesale division and getting completely out of the oil and gas business. HBC also sold its Canadian fur-auction business to Hudson's Bay Fur Sales Canada (now North American Fur Auctions). The Northern Stores Division was sold that same year to a group of investors and employees, which adopted The North West Company name three years later.

The HBC acquired Towers Department Stores in 1990, combining them with the Zellers chain, and Woodward's stores in 1993, converting them into Bay or Zellers stores. Kmart Canada was acquired in 1998 and merged with Zellers.

In 1991, the Bay agreed to stop retailing fur in response to complaints from people opposed to killing animals for this purpose. In 1997, the Bay reopened its fur salons to meet the demand of consumers.

21st century
In December 2003, Maple Leaf Heritage Investments, a Nova Scotia-based company created to acquire shares of Hudson's Bay Company, announced that it was considering making an offer to acquire all or some of the common shares of Hudson's Bay Company. Maple Leaf Heritage Investments is a subsidiary of B-Bay Inc. Its CEO and chairman is American businesswoman Anita Zucker, widow of Jerry Zucker. Zucker had previously been the head of the Polymer Group, which acquired another Canadian institution, Dominion Textile.

It had been a member of the International Association of Department Stores from 2001 to 2005. On 26 January 2006, the HBC's board agreed to a bid from Jerry Zucker. The South Carolina billionaire financier was a longtime HBC minority shareholder. In a 9 March 2006 press release, the HBC announced that Zucker would replace Yves Fortier as governor and George Heller as CEO, becoming the first US citizen to lead the company. After Jerry Zucker's death, the board named his widow, Anita Zucker, as HBC Governor and HBC Deputy-Governor Rob Johnston as CEO.

On 16 July 2008, the company was sold to NRDC Equity Partners for just over $1.1 billion, a private equity firm based in Purchase, New York, which already owned Lord & Taylor, the oldest department store in the United States. The Canadian and U.S. holdings were transferred to NRDC Equity Partners' holding company, Hudson's Bay Trading Company, as of late 2008.

In October 2012, the HBC announced a $1.6 billion initial public offering (IPO); Baker planned to use the IPO to allow Canadian ownership to return to the company, and to help pay off debts with other partners. Additionally, the company also announced that it would re-brand The Bay department store chain as "Hudson's Bay". The new Hudson's Bay brand was launched in March 2013, incorporating a new logo with an updated rendition of the classic Hudson's Bay Company coat of arms, designed to be modern and better reflect the company's heritage. Following the IPO, HBC had also introduced a new corporate logo of its own (reviving a wordmark from the original HBC flag), but the new logo was not intended to be a consumer-facing brand.

In January 2016, HBC announced it would expand deeper into digital space with the acquisition of an online flash sales site, the Gilt Groupe, for US$250 million. HBC also announced its expansion into the Netherlands in May 2016 with the takeover of 20 former Vroom & Dreesmann (V&D) sites by 2017. V&D, a historic Dutch department store chain, had gone bankrupt and shut down in early 2016. As of November 2017, the company also expanded retail operations into Europe, including five Saks Off Fifth stores in Germany.

On 1 April 2018, HBC disclosed that more than five million credit and debit cards used for in-store purchases had been recently breached by hackers. The compromised credit card transactions took place at Saks Fifth Avenue, Saks Off 5th, and Lord & Taylor stores. The hack had been discovered by Gemini Advisory, which called the breach "amongst the biggest and most damaging to ever hit retail companies". A July 2019 hack of Capital One, which provides HBC Mastercards, did not affect the HBC credit cards or card applications, according to HBC.

In June 2019, a consortium including chairman Richard Baker, Rhône Group, WeWork, Hanover Investments (Luxembourg) and Abrams Capital Management announced that it wanted to take the company private. The group then owned just over 50 per cent of HBC shares. In mid-August, the consortium said that it owned 57 per cent of the HBC shares. By 19 August 2019, however, Canadian investment firm Catalyst Capital Group Inc. said it had acquired enough shares to block the plan. A U.S. company, Land & Buildings Investment Management, the owner of over 6 per cent of the shares, had also criticized the Baker plan. In March 2020, Baker and a group of shareholders were successful in taking the company private.

Aside from Hudson's Bay, Saks Fifth Avenue, and Saks Off Fifth, HBC sold Galeria Kaufhof, Gilt Groupe, and Lord & Taylor by 
August, 2019. In June 2018, HBC announced it would sell Gilt Groupe to online fashion store Rue La La for an undisclosed sum. In June, 2019 HBC announced its intent to sell the last 49.99 percent of Galeria Kaufhof shares it held to Austrian firm Signa Holding. In August, 2019 Lord & Taylor was sold to Le Tote for $75 million. The remaining stores in the Netherlands were sold by the end of 2019.

By early September 2019, it was clear that HBC was streamlining its operations, with the sales of Galeria Kaufhof, Gilt Groupe, and Lord & Taylor as the most recent steps. A feature article by Bloomberg News mentioned that CEO Helena Foulkes, recruited in 2018, "had helped improve the bottom line at Hudson's Bay". She was selling assets "to put the company on more solid financial footing" and could then focus on Saks Fifth Avenue and the Bay. On the other hand, Bloomberg suggested that millennial shoppers prefer to make purchases online, or direct from various brands' own stores, and that HBC "has yet to offer something they can't find somewhere else and risks drifting into irrelevance".

In February 2020, shareholders of the company voted in favour of a plan to become a private company at a special meeting of shareholders. Under the plan of arrangement, the company will be owned by a group of continuing shareholders led by HBC governor and executive chairman Richard Baker. Effective 3 March 2020, the company was delisted from the Toronto Stock Exchange, with Richard A. Baker replacing Foulkes as CEO.

Acquisition and sale of other chains
From 2004 to 2008, the HBC owned and operated a small chain of off-price stores called Designer Depot. Similar to the Winners and HomeSense retail format, Designer Depot did not meet sales expectations, and its nine stores were sold. Another HBC chain, Fields, was sold to a private firm in 2012. Established in 1950, Fields was acquired by Zellers in 1976. When Zellers was acquired by HBC in 1978, Fields became part of the HBC portfolio. In early 2019, HBC announced that all 37 Home Outfitters stores would be phased out by year end.

In early 2017, the Hudson's Bay Company made an overture to Macy's for a potential takeover of the U.S. department store chain. Later, HBC also considered a purchase of Neiman Marcus Group Inc. It did not proceed with either deal.
On March 16, 2022, it was announced that HBC and Sycamore Partners were preparing bids to buy Kohl's.

Zellers

In September 2011, the HBC announced that it would sell the majority of the Zellers leases for $1.825 billion to the U.S.-based retailer Target Corporation and shutter all of their remaining locations by early 2013. Target used the acquisition of this real estate as a means to enable its entry in the Canadian market. HBC used some of the proceeds to pay down debt and to invest in growing its Hudson's Bay and Lord & Taylor banners. In January 2013, it was confirmed that three Zellers locations, re-purposed as discount department stores for The Bay and Home Outfitters, would remain open. The Target Canada chain folded in 2015; the leases were subsequently returned to landlords or re-sold to other retailers. Zellers was still owned by HBC as two remaining stores following the sale of its lease portfolio to Target Canada in 2011. By September 2019, the re-purposed Toronto and Ottawa Zellers locations were still operating as discount department stores.

In August 2022, the Hudson's Bay Company announced it would be reviving the Zellers brand through online shopping and physical locations in 2023.

Lord & Taylor

On 24 January 2012, the Financial Post reported that Richard Baker (owner of NDRC and governor of Hudson's Bay Company) had dissolved Hudson's Bay Trading Company and that the HBC would now also operate the Lord & Taylor chain. At the time, the company was run by president Bonnie Brooks. Baker remained governor and CEO of the business, and Donald Watros stayed on as chief operating officer.

In 2018, HBC in a joint venture sold the building that housed its flagship Lord & Taylor store on Fifth Avenue in Manhattan to WeWork Property Advisors for $850 million. WeWork was set to occupy the uppermost floors of the building, with the rest of the building remaining a flagship space for Lord & Taylor. The deal also included the use of floors of certain HBC-owned department stores in New York, Toronto, Vancouver and Germany as WeWork's shared office workspaces.

In August 2019, HBC announced that it would sell their Lord & Taylor business to Le Tote Inc., which was to pay  in cash when the deal closes (probably before year end 2019) and an additional  two years later. HBC was to get a 25 per cent equity stake in Le Tote. The deal, expected to close before year end, required HBC to pay the stores' rent for at least three years, leading one news report to describe it as "Not a clean exit". The liability to HBC for the rents was estimated at  cash per year.

Saks, Inc.

On 29 July 2013, Hudson's Bay Company announced that it would buy Saks, Inc., operator of the U.S. Saks Fifth Avenue brand, for US$2.9 billion, or $16 per share. The merger was completed on 3 November 2013. The company also stated that as a result of the purchase, Canadian consumers would see Saks stores arriving in their country soon. After the purchase was finalized, HBC had a net loss of $124.2 million in the 2013 3Q due to the cost of the purchase and promotions.

Galeria Kaufhof

On 1 November 2017, HBC received an unsolicited offer from Austrian firm Signa Holding for Kaufhof and other real estate. An unnamed source told CNBC that the value of the offer was approximately 3 billion euros. This information on the offer was also reiterated in a press release by activist shareholder Land & Buildings Investment Management, which urged HBC to accept the offer; the company replied that the offer was incomplete and did not provide indication of financing for the deal. In late 2018, Galeria Kaufhof and Karstadt merged as part of a spin off.

HBC announced its intent to sell the last 49.99 percent of Galeria Kaufhof shares it held to Austrian firm Signa Holding in June 2019. The sale of the real estate in Germany had gained US$1.5 billion (€1 billion) for HBC. At that time, HBC still had a retail operation in the Netherlands, using the Vroom & Dreesmann locations it had purchased in 2017. On 31 August 2019, the company announced that all 15 of those stores would be sold by year end.

Operations
The HBC is diversified into joint ventures and other types of business products. The HBC has credit card, mortgage, and personal insurance branches. These other products and services are joint partnerships with other corporations. The HBC also has an HBC Rewards program, where Rewards points can be redeemed in house.

The HBC is involved in community and charity activities. The HBC Rewards Community Program raises funds for community causes. The HBC Foundation is a charity agency involved in social issues and service. The HBC used to sponsor the annual HBC Run for Canada, a series of public-participation runs and walks held across the country on Canada Day to raise funds for Canadian athletes. The company discontinued this event in 2009.

Olympic outfitter

The HBC was the official outfitter of clothing for members of the Canadian Olympic team in 1936, 1960, 1964, 1968, 2006, 2008, 2010, 2012, 2014 and 2016. The sponsorship has been renewed through 2020. Since the late 2000s, HBC has used its status as the official Canadian Olympics team outfitter to gain global exposure, as part of a turnaround plan that included shedding under-performing brands and luring new high-end brands.

On 2 March 2005, the company was announced as the new clothing outfitter for the Canadian Olympic team, in a $100 million deal, providing apparel for the 2006, 2008, 2010, and 2012 Games, having outbid the existing Canadian Olympic wear-supplier, Roots Canada, which had supplied Canada's Olympic teams from 1998 to 2004. The Canadian Olympic collection is sold through Hudson's Bay (and Zellers until 2013 when the Zellers leases were sold to Target Canada).

HBC's 2006 Winter Olympics and 2008 Summer Olympics uniforms and toques received a mixed reception for their multicoloured stripes (green, red, yellow, blue) which seemed to be not-so-subtle advertising for HBC rather than representing the Canadian Olympic team's traditional colours of red and white (with black as a secondary), in contrast to well-received Root's 1998 collection with its trendy red letter jackets and Poor Boy caps. HBC produced 80 per cent to 90 per cent of their Olympic clothes in China which was criticized, as Roots ensured that the Olympic clothes were made in Canada using Canadian material.

HBC's apparel for the 2010 Winter Olympics held in Vancouver proved to be extremely successful, in part because Canada was the host country and their athletes had a record medal haul.

The HBC's 2010 Winter Olympics apparel was also controversial due to a knitted, machine-made sweater that looked like a Cowichan sweater. After a meeting between HBC representatives and Cowichan Tribes, a compromise was made between the parties; knitters would have an opportunity to sell their sweaters at the downtown Vancouver HBC store, alongside the HBC imitations.

Lord Sebastian Coe, chairman of the 2012 London Olympic Games Organizing Committee, who attended the Vancouver Olympics, noted that the Canadians were passionate in embracing the Games with their "Canada" hoodies and their red mittens (of which 2.6 million pairs sold that year). HBC has continued to produce these red mittens for subsequent Olympic Games.

In 2021, it was announced that beginning with the 2022 Winter Olympics, Lululemon would replace the HBC as Canada's Olympic outfitter.

Archives

The legacy of the HBC has been maintained in part by the detailed record-keeping and archiving of material by the company. Before 1974, the records of the HBC were kept in the London office headquarters. The HBC opened an archives department to researchers in 1931. In 1974, Hudson's Bay Company Archives (HBCA) were transferred from London and placed on deposit with the Manitoba archives in Winnipeg. The company granted public access to the collection the following year.

On 27 January 1994, the company's archives were formally donated to the Archives of Manitoba.

At the time of the donation, the appraised value of the records was nearly $60 million. A foundation, Hudson's Bay Company History Foundation funded through the tax savings resulting from the donation, was established to support the operations of the HBC Archive as a division of the Archives of Manitoba, along with other activities and programs.

In 2007, Hudson's Bay Company Archives became part of the United Nations "Memory of the World Programme" project, under UNESCO. The records covered the HBC history from the founding of the company in 1670. The records contained business transactions, medical records, personal journals of officials, inventories, company reports, etc.

Corporate governance

, the members of the board of directors of Hudson's Bay Company are:

 Richard A. Baker
 Robert C. Baker
 Eric Gross
 Steven Langman
 David G. Leith
 William L. Mack
 Lee S. Neibart
 Denise Pickett
 Wayne Pommen
 Earl Rotman
 Matthew Rubel
 Andrea Wong

Corporate hierarchy
In the 18th and 19th centuries, Hudson's Bay Company operated with a very rigid employee hierarchy. This hierarchy essentially broke down into two levels; the officers and the servants. Comprising the officers were the factors, masters and chief traders, clerks and surgeons. The servants were the tradesmen, boatmen, and labourers. The officers essentially ran the fur trading posts. They had many duties which included supervising the workers in their trade posts, valuing the furs, and keeping trade and post records. In 1821, when Hudson's Bay Company and the North West Company merged, the hierarchy became even stricter and the lines between officers and servants became virtually impossible to cross. Officers in charge of individual trading posts had much responsibility because they were directly in charge of enforcing the policies made by the governor and committee (the board) of the company. One of these policies was the price of particular furs and trade goods. These prices were called the Official and Comparative Standards. Made-Beaver, the quality measurement of the pelt, was the means of exchange used by Hudson's Bay Company to define the Official and Comparative Standards. Because the governor was stationed in London, England, they needed to have reliable officers managing the trade posts halfway around the world. Because the fur trade was a very dynamic market, HBC needed to have some form of flexibility when dealing with prices and traders. Price fluctuation was deferred to the officers in charge of the trade posts, and the head office recorded any difference between the company's standard and that set by the individual officers. Overplus, or any excess revenue gained by officers, was strictly documented to insure that it was not being pocketed and taken from the company. This strict yet flexible hierarchy exemplifies how Hudson's Bay Company was able to be so successful while still having its central management and trade posts located so far apart.

Hierarchichal order pre-1821

Hierarchical order 1821–1871

Progression
In the 19th century, career progression for officers, together referred to as the Commissioned Gentlemen, was to enter the company as a fur trader. Typically, they were men who had the capital to invest in starting up their trading. They sought to be promoted to the rank of Chief Trader. A Chief Trader would be in charge of an individual post and was entitled to one share of the company's profits. Chief Factors sat in council with the Governors and were the heads of districts. They were entitled to two shares of the company's profits or losses. The average income of a Chief Trader was £360 and that of a Chief Factor was £720.

Governors

Chronological list of Governors of the Hudson's Bay Company:

 1670–82  Prince Rupert of the Rhine
 1683–85  James Stuart, Duke of York – resigned as governor to become James II, King of England.
 1685–92  John Churchill, Earl of Marlborough
 1692–96  Sir Stephen Evance
 1696–1700  Sir William Trumbull
 1700–12  Sir Stephen Evance
 1712–43  Sir Bibye Lake
 1744–46  Benjamin Pitt
 1746–50  Thomas Knapp
 1750–60  Sir Atwell Lake
 1760–70  Sir William Baker
 1770–82  Sir Bibye Lake, Jr.
 1782–99  Samuel Wegg
 1799–1807  Sir James Winter Lake
 1807–12  William Mainwaring
 1812–22  Joseph Berens
 1822–52  Sir John Henry Pelly in 1826, Simpson becomes governor of the Canadian region.
 1852–56  Andrew Wedderburn Colvile
 1856–58  John Shepherd
 1858–63  Henry Hulse Berens
 1863–68  Sir Edmund Walker Head
 1868–69  John Wodehouse, 1st Earl of Kimberley
 1869–74  Sir Stafford Henry Northcote
 1874–80  George Joachim Goschen
 1880–89  Eden Colvile
 1889–1914  Donald Alexander Smith
 1914–15  Sir Thomas Skinner
 1916–25  Sir Robert Molesworth Kindersley
 1925–31  Charles Vincent Sale
 1931–52  Sir Patrick Ashley Cooper – first governor to visit HBC operations in Canada.
 1952–65  William "Tony" Keswick
 1965–70  Derick Heathcoat-Amory
 1970–82  George T. Richardson
 1982–94  Donald S. McGiverin
 1994–97  David E. Mitchell
 1997–2006  L. Yves Fortier
 2006–08  Jerry Zucker
 2008  Anita Zucker – first female governor.
 2008–present  Richard Baker

Miscellany

Rent obligation under charter
Under the charter establishing Hudson's Bay Company, the company was required to give two elk skins and two black beaver pelts to the English king, then Charles II, or his heirs, whenever the monarch visited Rupert's Land. The exact text from the 1670 Charter reads:

The ceremony was first conducted with the Prince of Wales (the future Edward VIII) in 1927, then with King George VI in 1939, and last with his daughter, Queen Elizabeth II in 1959 and 1970. On the last such visit, the pelts were given in the form of two live beavers, which the Queen donated to the Winnipeg Zoo in Assiniboine Park. However, when the company permanently moved its headquarters to Canada, the Charter was amended to remove the rent obligation. Each of the four "rent ceremonies" took place in or around Winnipeg.

HBC explorers, builders, and associates
 James Knight (c. 1640 – c. 1721) was a director of Hudson's Bay Company and an explorer who died in an expedition to the Northwest Passage.
 Henry Kelsey (c. 1667 – 1 November 1724), a.k.a. the Boy Kelsey, was an English fur trader, explorer, and sailor who played an important role in establishing Hudson's Bay Company in Canada. In 1690, Henry Kelsey embarked on a 2-year exploration journey that made him the first white man to see buffalo.
 Thanadelthur (c. 1697 – 5 February 1717) was a woman of the Chipewyan nation who served as a guide and interpreter for Hudson's Bay Company.
 Samuel Hearne (1745–92) was an English explorer, fur-trader, author, and naturalist. In 1774, Hearne built Cumberland House for the Hudson's Bay Company, its first interior trading post and the first permanent settlement in present Saskatchewan.
 David Thompson (30 April 1770 – 10 February 1857) was a British-Canadian fur trader that worked for both the Hudson's Bay Company and the North West Trading Company. He is best known for his extensive explorations and map-making activities. He mapped almost half of North America between the 46th and 60th parallels, from the St.Lawrence and Great Lakes all the way to the Pacific.
 Thomas Douglas, Lord Selkirk (20 June 1771 – 8 April 1820) was a Scottish peer. He was a Scottish philanthropist who, as HBC's majority shareholder, arranged to purchase land at Red River to establish a colony for dispossessed Scottish immigrants.
 Isobel Gunn or Isabella Gunn (c. 1780 – 7 November 1861), also known as John Fubbister or Mary Fubbister, was a Scottish labourer employed by Hudson's Bay Company (HBC), noted for having passed herself as a man, thereby becoming the first European woman to travel to Rupert's Land, now part of Western Canada.
 George Simpson (1787 – 7 September 1860) was the Canadian governor of Hudson's Bay Company during the period of its greatest power, a period which began in 1821 following the company's merger with the North West Trading Company.
 John McLean (c. 1799– 8 September 1890), a Scoto-Canadian trapper and trader who successfully crossed the entire Labrador Peninsula, opening up an overland route between Fort Smith on Lake Melville and Fort Chimo on Ungava Bay; first European to discover Churchill Falls on the Churchill River.
 Donald Smith, 1st Baron Strathcona and Mount Royal (6 August 1820 – 21 January 1914), at various times Chief Factor of the Labrador district, Commissioner of the Montreal district, and President of the Council of the Northern Department, who pacified Louis Riel during the Red River Rebellion of 1870, thus enabling the transfer of Rupert's Land from the HBC to the fledgling government of Canada. Later, he became Governor of the HBC.
 Dr. John Rae (Inuktitut Aglooka ᐊᒡᓘᑲ English: "long strider") (30 September 1813 – 22 July 1893) was a Scottish doctor who explored Northern Canada, surveyed parts of the Northwest Passage and reported the fate of the Franklin Expedition.
 William Keswick (15 April 1834 – 9 March 1912) and grandson Sir William Johnstone Keswick (1903–90) served at HBC; the former as a director and later as governor from 1952 to 1965. The Keswick family are the Scottish business dynasty that controls Hong Kong-based Jardine Matheson, one of the original British trading houses or Hongs in British Hong Kong.

HBC sternwheelers and steamships

 Beaver (1835–74)
 Otter (1852–95)
 Anson Northup (1859–60)
 Caledonia (1891–98) – She ran aground on rocks at Port Simpson during a storm and her hull was destroyed. Her engines were put into the Caledonia 2
 Caledonia (2) (1898–1909) – Her machinery was from the Caledonia 1
 Mount Royal (1902–07)
 Princess Louise (1878–83)
 Strathcona (1900)
 Port Simpson (1907–12)
 Hazelton (1907–12)
 Distributor (1920–48)

Rivals
The HBC is the only European trading company to have survived. It outlived all its rivals.

See also

 Beaver hat
 British colonization of the Americas
 Frontier (2016 TV series)
 Home Outfitters
 Hudson's Bay Company vessels
 Hudson's Bay point blanket
 Hudson's Bay tokens
 James Douglas (governor)
 List of department stores by country § Canada
 List of Hudson's Bay Company trading posts
 List of trading companies
 New Caledonia (Canada)
 North-West Rebellion
 The Romance of the Far Fur Country

References

Bibliography

Further reading

 
 
 
 
 
 
 
  – 2011 reprint: 
 
 
 
 
 
 
 
 
 
 
 
 
 
 
 
 
  – 1983 edition: 
 
 
 
  – Also:

External links

 
 HBC Heritage website
 Hudson's Bay Company Archives – held by the Government of Manitoba
 
 
 John Work Papers. 1823–1862. 0.42 cubic feet (1 box). At the Labor Archives of Washington, University of Washington Libraries Special Collections. Contains records from Work's service as an officer of the Hudson's Bay Company at various company settlements, including Fort Vancouver, Fort Colvile, Spokane House, Fort Simpson, Fort Nisqually, and Fort Victoria.
 Hudson's Bay Company papers at the University of Oregon
 The Other Side of the Ledger: An Indian View of the Hudson's Bay Company
 The Canadian Encyclopedia, The Hudson's Bay Company 
 H. Bullock-Webster fonds – An artistic rendition of the Canadian fur trade, from the UBC Library Digital Collections, depicting social life, activities and customs in Hudson's Bay Company posts in the 19th Century
 Elizabeth F. Washburn Journal on her experiences on board the Hudson's Bay Company's supply ship "Rupertsland" at Dartmouth College Library
 

 
1670 establishments in England
2008 mergers and acquisitions
2012 initial public offerings
2020 mergers and acquisitions
British colonization of the Americas
Canadian brands
Canadian folklore
Chartered companies
Clothing retailers of Canada
Companies based in Brampton
Retail companies established in 1670
Companies formerly listed on the Toronto Stock Exchange
Economic history of Canada
English colonization of the Americas
Fur trade
History of the Pacific Northwest
History of the Rocky Mountains
Multinational companies headquartered in Canada
Oregon Country
Private equity portfolio companies
Trading companies of England
Trading companies of Canada
Trading companies established in the 17th century
Pemmican War